Green Branch is a  long second-order tributary to Marshyhope Creek in Kent County, Delaware.

Course
Green Branch rises on the Webber Branch divide at Melvin Crossroads and then flows generally south to join Marshyhope Creek about 1.5 miles northeast of Adamsville, Delaware.

Watershed
Green Branch drains  of area, receives about 44.8 in/year of precipitation, and is about 5.60% forested.

See also
List of rivers of Delaware

References

Rivers of Delaware
Rivers of Kent County, Delaware